Albums – Top 100 is a record chart ranking the 100 most popular music albums and EPs in the Czech Republic, published weekly by the IFPI Czech Republic. Published since 1996, it is based on sales (both at retail and digital), and online streaming on Spotify, Apple Music, Google Play and Deezer. Besides the main record chart with 100 ranks, the IFPI Czech Republic also publishes Albums Classical – Top 10 which features exclusively the 10 most popular albums of classical music. The chart covers approximately 91 per cent of whole music market in the Czech Republic.

As of the issue dated August 3, 2020 (week no. 2020/31), the current number-one album on the chart is Folklore by Taylor Swift.

List of number-one albums 

 List of number-one albums (Czech Republic)

See also 

 Rádio – Top 100 (Czech Republic)
 Rádio – Top 100 (Slovakia)

References

External links 

 ifpicr.cz 
 Albums – Top 100 

Record charts
Czech music